Phyxioschema is a genus of Asian spiders in the family Euagridae. It was first described by Eugène Simon in 1889.

Species
 it contains the following species:
Phyxioschema erawan Schwendinger, 2009 – Thailand
Phyxioschema eripnastes Schwendinger, 2009 – Thailand
Phyxioschema gedrosia Schwendinger & Zamani, 2018 – Iran
Phyxioschema huberi Schwendinger, 2009 – Thailand
Phyxioschema raddei Simon, 1889 (type) – Kazakhstan, Iran, Afghanistan, Uzbekistan, Turkmenistan, Tajikistan
Phyxioschema roxana Schwendinger & Zonstein, 2011 – Uzbekistan, Tajikistan
Phyxioschema sayamense Schwendinger, 2009 – Thailand
Phyxioschema spelaeum Schwendinger, 2009 – Thailand
Phyxioschema suthepium Raven & Schwendinger, 1989 – Thailand

References

Euagridae
Mygalomorphae genera
Taxa named by Eugène Simon